Fort-Mardyck is a former commune in the Nord department in northern France. It has been part of the commune of Dunkirk since 9 December 2010. In 2019 it had 3,403 inhabitants.

History

The fort of Mardyck was constructed in 1622 by architect Jean Gamel. It was built for the Spanish who ruled Flanders at the time. The fort was captured by the French in 1644 but then lost to the Spanish in 1652. The fort was again besieged and captured by an Anglo-French force under the Comte de Turrenne on 21 September 1657. Turrene handed the fort over to the English Commonwealth in accordance with the terms of their involvement. The following month the Spanish attempted to retake the fort one last time but the English garrison managed to repel the assault. After having bought Dunkirk and the fort of Mardyck from the English in 1662, King Louis XIV of France ordered that the fort be dismantled.

On 12 February 1867, a French imperial decree established Fort-Mardyck as an independent municipality.

Heraldry

References

External links
Flags of the World - Fort Mardyck

Former communes of Nord (French department)
1622 establishments in the Holy Roman Empire
French Flanders